Buckland Ripers is a small village in Dorset, England, situated two miles north west of Weymouth.

External links
 Buckland Ripers local history website

External links

Villages in Dorset